George Burt may refer to:

George Burt (Canada) (1903–1988), Canadian director of the United Auto Workers and political candidate
George Burt (Britain) (1816–1894), British builder
George Burt (fencer) (1884–1964), British Olympic fencer
George Burt (cricketer) (1886–1935), Scottish cricketer